Liliane Barrard ( – 24 June 1986) and Maurice Barrard ( – 24 June 1986) were a French couple who gained fame climbing at high altitude, mainly in the Himalayan and Karakoram ranges, and emphasizing Alpine-style 'fast and light' ascents.

Early life
The couple met while climbing in South America, having previously worked mainly in teaching.
Billing themselves as the 'World's Highest Couple', they successfully climbed Gasherbrum II (8,035 m/26,360 ft) in 1982 with Liliane's brother, Alain Bontemps, and Nanga Parbat (8,126 m/26,658 ft) in 1984 (first female ascent of this peak for Liliane). Although narrowly failing to make the summit of Makalu (8,462 m/27,765 ft), they nevertheless put the finances together to attempt K2 (8,611 m/28,268 ft) in 1986 with a small team consisting of themselves, Polish climber Wanda Rutkiewicz and French climber Michel Parmentier.

K2
The start to the Barrards' K2 expedition was not a promising one: Maurice and Liliane "had left their entire expedition budget—thousands of dollars plus airline tickets and passports on the backseat of a taxi!" Everything was sorted out in due course, and the Barrards, Wanda Rutkiewicz and Parmentier arrived at the K2 motel at about the same time as Alan Rouse's British expedition, then headed to Base Camp.

The Barrards' expedition ascended the mountain very slowly, spending nights at 6300, 7100, 7700, 7900, and 8300 meters (20,669; 23,294; 25,262; 25,919; and 27,250 feet, respectively) on the climb. They spent their last night before their summit attempt bivouacked with a tent but no sleeping bags. The Barrards, Rutkiewicz, and Parmentier all summited successfully by 11:00am on June 23, 1986. Wanda Rutkiewicz was the first female ascender of K2, a mere 30 minutes before Liliane Barrard. Both women summited K2 without using supplemental oxygen.  

The four climbers descended only as far as their bivouac site from the night before, near the Bottleneck (a treacherous terrain feature at around 8,300 m/27,250 feet). The Barrards and their group had run out of fuel for their stoves (which are necessary to melt snow for water in order to prevent dehydration at high altitude). Parmentier descended first, to try and borrow some stove fuel from a nearby pair of Basque climbers, Mari Abrego and Josema Casimiro. The others descended after him. Rutkiewicz caught up with Parmentier; the Barrards lagged behind. The Basque climbers had also run out of gas, and accompanied Parmentier and Rutkiewicz back to the French Camp Three, at 7800m/25,600 feet.

Rutkiewicz and the Basques continued down the mountain, and Parmentier waited for the Barrards to reach Camp Three. The weather was deteriorating. A French climber climbing with an Italian expedition, Benoît Chamoux, tried to convince Parmentier to come down, without success, and left him a radio before turning around and heading back toward Base Camp. Eventually Parmentier, who had tried to wait for some sign of the Barrards, began to descend, in white-out conditions and gale-force winds. Parmentier was eventually guided down the mountainside via radio directions from Base Camp, about 3000m/9,843 feet below, based on the few landmarks he could find in the blizzard.

Rutkiewicz, suffering from frostbite, and Parmentier both reached Base Camp alive. The Barrards were never seen alive again. The morning after summiting, Maurice had been very tired, and he and Liliane had left their tent after their climbing partners. It was windy and visibility was poor. The most likely scenarios are that the Barrards wandered off-route in the storm; that they fell; or that they collapsed from exhaustion and possible hypoxia.

Aftermath

Notes
 That summer, known as the ‘Black Summer of 1986’, saw 13 deaths and 27 ascents on K2.  
 During the 'Black Summer', many expeditions shared in a surfeit of tragedies. An American expedition to the South-South-West Ridge suffered two casualties --John Smolich and Alan Pennington were killed in an avalanche on June 21, after which their teammates left the mountain. Maurice and Liliane Barrard were lost on their descent after a successful summit bid, on June 25. A Polish climber, Tadeusz Piotrowski, fell to his death after a successful summit of the Central Rib of the South Face, on July 10. On July 16, Renato Casarotto fell into a crevasse, after an unsuccessful attempt at climbing the South-South-West Ridge, and died later that day after being pulled out. Wojciech Wroz, a Polish climber, died during his descent on August 3-4, after a successful ascent of the South-South-West Ridge. On August 4, Mohammed Ali (Sirdar, or leader, of a South Korean expedition's high-altitude porters) was killed by stonefall on the Abruzzi Ridge. British climber Julie Tullis died after a successful summit attempt and forced descent to Camp Four, possibly from High Altitude Cerebral Edema (HACE) on August 7. Two Austrian climbers, Alfred Imitzer and Hannes Wieser, died in a descent from Camp Four during a storm on August 10. British climber Alan Rouse is presumed to have died the same day; as was Dobroslawa Miodowicz-Wolf, a Polish climber who disappeared on fixed ropes below Camp Three. Difficult weather conditions caused many other injuries and near-fatalities throughout the summer.
 The Barrards had planned to attempt the notorious East or Kangshung face of Everest (8,848 m/29,028 ft) following their K2 bid.

See also
1986 K2 Disaster
List of climbers
List of solved missing person cases

References

Books
Jordan, Jennifer, Savage Summit: True Stories of the First Five Women Who Climbed K2 (2006) 
Reinisch, Getrude, Wanda Rutkiewicz: A Caravan of Dreams (2000)  

1940s births
1980s missing person cases
1986 deaths
Formerly missing people
French mountain climbers
Married couples
Missing person cases in Pakistan
Mountaineering deaths on K2
Sport deaths in China